Rosa Nouchette Carey (27 September 1840 – 9 July 1909) was an English children's writer and popular novelist, whose works reflected the values of her time and were thought of as wholesome for girls. However, they are "not entirely bereft of grit and realism."

Life
Born in Stratford-le-Bow, Rosa was the sixth of the seven children of William Henry Carey (died 1867), shipbroker, and his wife, Maria Jane (died 1870), daughter of Edward J. Wooddill. She was brought up in London at Tryons Road, Hackney, Middlesex and in South Hampstead. She was educated at home and at the Ladies' Institute, St John's Wood, where she was a contemporary and friend of the German-born poet Mathilde Blind (1841–1896). Her first novel, Nellie's Memories (1868), arose out of stories she had told to her younger sister.

As her writing career expanded after the death of her parents, so did her family responsibilities. When her mother died in 1870, she and an unmarried sister went to keep house for a widowed brother and look after his children. Later the sister married and the brother died, leaving Carey in sole charge of the children. Among her close friends was the prolific novelist Mrs Henry Wood. The poet Helen Marion Burnside came to live with her in about 1875, and Carey's sister returned to keep house for them after her husband died. Carey died of lung cancer at her home in Putney, London on 19 July 1909 and was buried in Hampstead Cemetery.

Writings
Nellie's Memories appears to have sold over 50,000 copies. Most of her 33 three-decker novels told pious, domestic stories, thought of as wholesome fiction for girls in the last third of the 19th century. Often sentimental, they reflect the values of the period, "treating housekeeping and woman's caring role as real work." However, her 1869 novel Wee Wifie features vitriol-throwing, opium addiction, and hereditary insanity. Also notable are Carey's sympathetic portrayals of women suffering from mental illness. Several novels suggest mental health can be ensured by "control of the will", as advocated by the psychiatrist Henry Maudsley. One of her books, Heriot's Choice (1879), was serialised in Charlotte M. Yonge's magazine The Monthly Packet and another, Mistress of Brae Farm (1896) in Argosy. She was a less intellectual, religious and humorous writer than Yonge, but placed her characters shrewdly in the populous urban, book-buying middle class.

Carey was on the staff of the Girl's Own Paper, for which she wrote eight serials. She also wrote a laudatory biographical collection of Twelve Notable Good Women of the XIXth Century (1899), including Queen Victoria and the Quaker philanthropist and reformer Elizabeth Fry.

The London publisher Macmillan had 18 novels by Carey on their Three-and-Sixpenny Library list in 1902. Some of her books were reprinted by the Religious Tract Society in the 1920s.

There have been doubts about whether Carey was the author of four thrillers published under the pseudonym Le Voleur in the 1890s.

Published works
Carey was a prolific author; the list of her works on the British Library catalogue reflects a publishing rate of at least a book a year.
Nellie's Memories: A Domestic Story (London: Tinsley Bros., 1868)
Wee Wifie (London, 1869)
Wooed and Married (London: Tinsley Bros., 1875)
Heriot's Choice (London: R. Bentley & Son, 1879)
Queenie's Whim (London: R. Bentley & Son, 1881)
Not like Other Girls (London: R. Bentley & Son, 1884)
Robert Ord's Atonement (London: R. Bentley & Son, 1884)
For Lilias (London: R. Bentley & Son, 1885)
Uncle Max (London: R. Bentley & Son, 1887)
Esther (London: The Religious Tract Society, 1887)
Only the Governess (London: R. Bentley & Son, 1888)
Aunt Diana (London: The Religious Tract Society, 1888)
The Search for Basil Lyndhurst (London: R. Bentley & Son, 1889. Reissued as Basil Lyndhurst, 1895)
Merle's Crusade (London: The Religious Tract Society, 1889)
Lover or Friend? (London: R. Bentley & Son, 1890)
Our Bessie (London: The Religious Tract Society, 1891)
Averil (London: The Religious Tract Society, 1891)
Sir Godfrey's Grand-daughters (London: R. Bentley & Son, 1892)
But Men Must Work (London: R. Bentley & Son, 1892)
Mrs. Romney (London: R. Bentley & Son, 1894)
Little Miss Muffet (London: The Religious Tract Society, 1894)
Tiney's Birthday Gift (1894)
By Order of the Brotherhood (as Le Voleur. London: Jarrold, 1895)
My Little Boy Blue (Fleming H. Revell Company) 1895
The Mistress of Brae Farm (London: R. Bentley & Son, 1896)
Other People's Lives (London: Hodder & Stoughton, 1897)
The Old, Old Story (London: R. Bentley & Son, 1897)
Doctor Luttrell's First Patient (London: Hutchinson & Co., 1897)
For the Love of a Bedouin Maid (as Le Voleur, London: Hutchinson & Co., 1897)
Mollie's Prince (London: Hutchinson & Co., 1898)
Barbara Heathcote's Trial (London, 1898)
Cousin Mona (London: The Religious Tract Society, 1897)
Twelve Notable Good Women of the XIX Century (Hutchinson, 1899)
Marquise (1899)
My Lady Frivol (London: Hutchinson & Co., 1899)
In the Tsar's Dominions (as Le Voleur, London, 1899)
Rue with a Difference (London: Macmillan & Co., 1900)
Life's Trivial Round (London: Hutchinson & Co., 1900)
The Clumpington Mystery (as Le Voleur, London, 1900)
Herb of Grace (London: Macmillan & Co., 1901)
The Highway of Fate (London: Macmillan & Co., 1902)
Mary St. John (London: Macmillan & Co., 1903)
Effie's Little Mother (London: R. Tuck & Sons, 1903)
At the Moorings (London: Macmillan & Co., 1904)
The Household of Peter (London: Macmillan & Co., 1905)
Esther Cameron's Story (London: The Religious Tract Society, 1906[?])
No Friend Like a Sister (London: Macmillan & Co., 1906)
The Angel of Forgiveness (London: Macmillan & Co., 1907)
The Sunny Side of the Hill (London: Macmillan & Co., 1908)
The Key of the Unknown (London: Macmillan & Co., 1909)
A Passage Perilous (London: Hodder & Stoughton, [n.d.])

See also

References

External links and written sources

Website biography: Retrieved 31 May 2011. Also bibliography: Retrieved 31 May 2011.
The New York Times notice of Rosa Nouchette Carey's death: Retrieved 31 May 2012.
Black, Helen C.: Notable Women Authors of the Day: Biographical Sketches (Glasgow: Davie Bryce & Sons, 1893)
Crisp, Jane: Rosa Nouchette Carey (1840–1909). A Bibliography Victorian Fiction Research Guides 16 (St Lucia, Queensland: University of Queensland, 1989)
Hartnell, Elaine: Gender, Religion and Domesticity in the Novels of Rosa Nouchette Carey (Aldershot: Ashgate, 2000). 
Shattock, J.: The Oxford Guide to British Women Writers (Oxford: OUP, 1993). 
American Publishers' Trade Bindings: Rosa Nouchette Carey

1840 births
1909 deaths
19th-century English women writers
19th-century English writers
English women novelists
Victorian novelists
Victorian women writers
Writers from London
People from Bow, London
English children's writers
19th-century English novelists
Deaths from lung cancer in England
20th-century English novelists
20th-century English women writers